Tony Yelk (born September 29, 1981 in Madison, Wisconsin) is a former National Football League placekicker. He attended high school in Poynette, Wisconsin and played on the college football team at Iowa State University. He was a four-year letter winner for the Cyclones and an All-Big 12 Conference and Freshmen All-American.

After graduating from ISU, Yelk signed with the Atlanta Falcons, where he spent part of his rookie year on the practice squad. He continued his playing career with the Jacksonville Jaguars in 2007, and signed with the Edmonton Eskimos of the Canadian Football League in 2008.

Yelk is the founder of Elite Kicking Solutions (EKS), which provides instruction to aspiring athletes. EKS is based in Atlanta, Georgia. Yelk also speaks at coaching clinics and is a special teams consultant.

1981 births
Living people
American football punters
Atlanta Falcons players
Edmonton Elks players
Iowa State Cyclones football players
Jacksonville Jaguars players
Sportspeople from Madison, Wisconsin
Players of American football from Wisconsin